Shapur Meshanshah, was a 3rd-century Sasanian prince. He was the second son of the Sassanian shah Shapur I, and was married to a certain queen named Denag, who bore him several children named Hormizd, Hormizdag, Odabakht, Bahram, Shapur, Peroz, and Shapurdukhtak. Shapur was during an unknown date appointed as the governor of Meshan by his father, and sometime later he gave his wife the honorific title of Dastgerd-Shapur. He died in 260, and was probably succeeded by his wife as the governor of Meshan.

Sources
 
 
 

3rd-century Iranian people
Sasanian princes
260 deaths
3rd-century births
Sasanian governors of Meshan